Terrorism in China refers to the use or threatened use of violence to effect political or ideological change in the People's Republic of China. The definition of terrorism differs among scholars, between international and national bodies and across time and there is no legally binding definition internationally. In the cultural setting of China, the term is relatively new and ambiguous.

The government of the People's Republic of China identifies terrorism as one of "Three Evils"  
These forces are seen by Beijing as inter-connected threats to social stability and national security. In particular, terrorism is viewed as a violent manifestation of ethnic separatism, and separatism is understood as a corollary of religious zealotry. The government has embarked on strike-hard campaigns to suppress these tendencies, particularly in Xinjiang and Tibetan regions.

Since the September 11 attacks in 2001, the PRC has strengthened its involvement in multilateral and bilateral counter-terrorism efforts. As a result of these efforts, several Uyghur separatist movements have been labelled as terrorist groups by the United Nations and U.S. Department of State. There have been allegations that the Chinese government has been applying charges of terrorism in an inconsistent and sometimes politically motivated manner.

Chinese cultural context
The concept of terrorism, as it evolved and is understood in the West, did not exist in imperial China. In that setting, political criminality took the form of violence against the emperor, and was viewed as harmful as it induced fear and led to "chaos." With the exception of "good" political violence against rulers whose lack of propriety and virtue resulted in loss of the mandate of heaven, violence was seen as contrary to human nature and the Tao. Kam Wong argues that the dynamics of imperial China form the basis for contemporary Chinese understandings of terrorism.

Fear of chaos and social disorder is a powerful factor in mobilizing political will to combat potential threats. In the modern context, any group or force with the potential to challenge the existing social order or the political security of the rulers may be considered a form of terrorism, "to be condemned unrelentingly and suppressed at all costs," according to Wong.

There is currently no clearly established definition for terrorism either nationally or internationally, though the National People's Congress is in the process of drafting legislation that would clarify the use of the term in Chinese law. The draft legislation, as reported by Xinhua News Agency, classified as terrorism acts that "cause or aim to cause severe harm to society by causing casualties, bringing about major economic losses, damaging public facilities or disturbing social order." Human rights groups charge that the term is sometimes applied to non-violent dissidents in China.

Regionally focused terrorism and political violence

Xinjiang

Media reports and scholarly studies of terrorism in contemporary China frequently focus on members of the largely Muslim Uyghur ethnic group, who are concentrated in the Northwestern province of Xinjiang. Throughout its history, the region now known as Xinjiang was ruled intermittently by China, while the local Uyghurs identify more closely with the cultures of Central Asia and had resisted attempts at assimilation to Han Chinese culture. From 1933 to 1934, Uyghurs founded a short-lived Islamic republic, and the Soviets supported Communist Uyghur rebels in the Ili Rebellion from 1944 to 1949 against the Republic of China, the Second East Turkestan Republic, before the Incorporation of Xinjiang into the People's Republic of China in 1949. After the Sino-Soviet split, the Soviet Union amassed troops on the Russian border with Xinjiang, and bolstered "East Turkestan" separatist movements, which received moral and material support from other regional militant groups. China accused the Soviets of engineering riots, and improved the military infrastructure there to combat it.

In the 1980s, Chinese authorities relaxed some of its repressive policies against ethnic minorities, and loosened border controls which allowed Uyghurs to travel to the Mecca Pilgrimage. During this period, some Uyghurs came into contact with radical Islamist groups operating in Central Asia and Pakistan, while others were studied in Koranic schools associated with Islamist movements. The increase in fundamentalism has been linked to the Islamic revival of the 1980s, following Deng Xiaoping's political reforms which sought to reduce the suppression of religion and promotion of atheism that was widespread during Mao's rule. Rémi Castets has commented that this led to a "more militant logic using Islam as an instrument for distinguishing Uyghur values from the non-clerical and atheistic values promoted by the Chinese authorities." Following the fall of the Soviet Union and the independence of the former Soviet republics in Central Asia, the Chinese government feared a resurgence of separatist movements, as well a spread of radical Islam in the region, which could destabilize its infrastructure in Xinjiang. During this time, countries such as Kazakhstan and Kirghizstan offered asylum to Uyghur refugees, and recognition to groups pursuing independence. To combat this, the Beijing government settled border disputes and offered economic co-operation with the Central Asian republics through the Shanghai Co-operation Organisation, and successfully persuaded these countries to ban Uyghur separatist groups residing there, as well as to extradite suspected Uyghur separatist refugees.

A chain of aggressive and belligerent press releases in the 1990s making false claims about violent insurrections in Xinjiang, and exaggerating both the number of Chinese migrants and the total number of Uyghurs in Xinjiang were made by the former Soviet supported URFET leader Yusupbek Mukhlisi.

There is no single Uyghur agenda, and grievances of Uyghurs against the Chinese government are mostly political in nature. While some Uyghurs desire an independent state in line with Turkic ethnic groups of Central Asia, others desire an autonomous relation with China while retaining their distinct culture, whereas others desire extensive integration with the Chinese political system.

The desire for independence or greater political and cultural autonomy largely stems from resentment over perceived restrictions to religious and cultural expression, ethnic conflict with the local Han Chinese population, income inequality, and the perception that Beijing's government is misallocating Xinjiang's natural resource wealth. Some groups have adopted violent tactics in pursuit of these goals, mostly the establishment of a separate Uyghur state called East Turkistan or Uyghuristan, which lays claim to a large part of China. Entities identified in Chinese government documents as having involvement in violent attacks include the East Turkistan Islamic Movement (ETIM), East Turkistan Liberation Organization (ETLO), United Revolutionary Front of East Turkestan (URFET), and the Uyghur Liberation Organization (ULO). Members of these groups are believed to have received training in Central Asian nations such as Afghanistan and Pakistan. Such violent groups have been noted as frequently splintering, merging, and collapsing, which makes claims difficult to substantiate. China's Muslim Hui people, who are comparatively well integrated into Chinese society, regard some Uyghurs as "unpatriotic separatists who give other Chinese Muslims a bad name," according to the New York Times.

Scholars have indicated that violence in Xinjiang is based on an assortment of ideologies, and there is no single dominant ideology among the Uyghurs. As James Millward writes, incidents have "been discontinuous and characterized by a variety of ideologies, Islam being only one of them." Islam, Pan-Turkic nationalism, and Uyghur nationalism are all factors in unrest in the Xinjiang region. There are six incidents in China from 1990 to 2005, according to Ogden, that meet the strictest definition of terrorism, meaning the use of "random" violence against innocent civilians to cause terror, and excluding calculated violence against the state to advance a secessionist movement. Among the events identified by Ogden was an incident on 6 February 1992 when Uyghur separatists (possibly belonging to the East Turkestan Islamic Party) detonated a bomb on a public bus in Urumqi, and a bomb attack on a hotel in Kashgar on 17 June 1992. Instances of violence by ethnic Uyghurs against security forces, organs or infrastructure of the state are far more common, but are distinguished by scholars from terrorism aimed against the civilian population. According to Martin, Chinese authorities frequently classify any act of violence or separatist activity in Xinjiang as a manifestation of terrorism, while comparable acts by ethnic Han Chinese would not be classified in this manner.

On 27 May 2014 a rare mass trial was held at a packed sports stadium in Xinjiang where three people were sentenced to death and another 53 received lengthy jail terms, after being convicted of terrorism charges. 39 people had been sentenced at a similar gathering the previous week. An anti-terror campaign which began in 2013 and continued into 2014 preceded the sentencing trials. The campaign included attacks on railway stations and a market in Xinjiang in which seventy people were killed and several hundred wounded.

TIP (ETIM) sent the "Turkistan Brigade" (Katibat Turkistani) to take part in the Syrian Civil War, most noticeably in the 2015 Jisr al-Shughur offensive. The leader of TIP (ETIM) in Syria is Abu Rida al-Turkestani.

There have been no terrorist attacks in Xinjiang since 2017 following the Chinese government's responses against it such as mass surveillance, increased arrests, and a system of re-education camps, estimated to hold a million Uyghurs and members of other Muslim minority ethnic groups.

Tibet

Tibet, the homeland of 7 million Tibetans, about half of whom live in the Tibetan Autonomous Region ("Tibet") and slightly more in the neighboring provinces of Qinghai, Yunnan, Gansu and Sichuan, lies for the most part within the People's Republic of China. For centuries Tibet resisted Chinese influence and control, with varying effectiveness. During periods when China was dominant, little more was involved than a Chinese governor and a garrison in Lhasa and Chinese administration in border areas such as Amdo and Kham with mixed populations of Tibetans and Chinese; no attempt was made by the Chinese to displace the Tibetan aristocracy or political and religious institutions of Tibet. From 1912 until 1950, Tibet experienced a period of de facto independence from Chinese rule, following the fall of the Qing dynasty. However, in 1950 the Chinese successfully incorporated Tibet and its outlying areas, occupied it, displaced Tibetan political and religious institutions, and assumed governance of the nation. Tibetan resistance since 1950 has taken a variety of forms, including instances of armed resistance that has been described as terrorism by Chinese authorities.

Discontent surrounding the Chinese-implemented land reforms and assimilation policies in Tibetan areas led to revolts and intermittent warfare, although the Chinese central government took care to delay or lengthen the implementation of certain programs in comparison to the rest of the nation. Some Tibetan paramilitary groups during the period, such as Chushi Gangdruk, received covert material and training support from the Central Intelligence Agency and the Taiwan-based Kuomintang government. The resistance culminated in the 1959 Tibetan Rebellion. The uprising was suppressed by Chinese forces, leading to the flight of the 14th Dalai Lama and some 100,000 other Tibetans to India.

In the aftermath of the revolt, Chinese authorities imposed radical social reforms and further restrictions to religious freedom. The Great Leap Forward and Cultural Revolution further intensified Tibetan resentment against Chinese rule and strengthened group identification. By 1980, Deng Xiaoping's ascension to leadership and the implementation of the Chinese economic reform program led to reform of earlier repressive policies against ethnic minorities, and granted nominal political autonomy to Tibet. While the Chinese government has invested considerably in the development of the Tibetan economy, education system and infrastructure, the continuing restrictions to religious expression and political participation resulted in resentment amongst the Tibetan populace, leading to the 1987–1989 Tibetan unrest. The unrest prompted Chinese authorities to focus more on the economic, educational, and infrastructural development of the region, intensify efforts to undermine the religious and political influence of the Dalai Lama, and encourage ethnic Han migration to the region.

Ogden notes that many Tibetans desire greater cultural and political autonomy, if not full independence, and outbreaks of violent clashes with authorities in the region occur only intermittently, such as in the 2008 Lhasa violence. Ogden credits the low incidence of conventional terrorism in Tibet to an undereducated population, swift and harsh responses to terrorism by the Chinese state, and the pacific influence of Buddhism. Nonetheless, there are segments of the Tibetan and Tibetan diasporic population who reject the leadership of the Dalai Lama and view violent opposition as the only viable route towards independence. Notable instances of violence against civilians include a series of attacks 1996 in the Tibetan capital of Lhasa, and a bombing in a public square in the city of Chengdu in April 2002, which Chinese authorities allege were carried out by Tibetan separatists. Chinese authorities adopt a broad definition of terrorism with respect to Tibet, and have labelled a variety of protests and expressions of opposition as terrorism. In 2012, for instance, authorities referred to the Dalai Lama's prayer sessions for Tibetan self-immolators as "terrorism in disguise." Authorities have also ascribed terrorist motives to Tibetan exiles who call for independence, and to Tibetan monks who travel to India without government authorization.

Terrorism in contemporary China

Legal definition and use
Under China's criminal law, acts of terrorism can carry a prison sentence of up to ten years. Since 2001, over 7,000 Chinese citizens have been convicted on terrorism charges. However, the law does not clearly define what constitutes a terrorist group or activity. In October 2011, Chinese authorities began crafting a bill that would more clearly define terrorism. According to the state-run Xinhua News Agency, the draft bill defines terrorist acts as those that are intended "induce public fear or to coerce state or international organisations by means of violence, sabotage, threats or other tactics...These acts cause or aim to cause severe harm to society by causing casualties, bringing about major economic losses, damaging public facilities or disturbing social order."

Human rights and international law experts have raised concerns over the implications of the bills in light of the lack of judicial independence in the People's Republic of China. A representative of Human Rights Watch was reported as saying "strengthening law enforcement powers without appropriate judicial checks and balances is dangerous," and further noted that it was unclear how and by whom groups and individuals would be designated as terrorists.

The government of the People's Republic of China identifies terrorism as one of "Three Evils", alongside separatism and religious fundamentalism. These forces are seen by Beijing as inter-connected threats to social stability and national security. In particular, terrorism is viewed as a violent manifestation of ethnic separatism, and separatism is understood as a corollary of religious zealotry.

Entities designated as terrorists threats
China's Ministry of Public Security issued a list of what it considers terrorist threats on 15 December 2003. These include the Eastern Turkestan Islamic Movement (ETIM), the East Turkestan Liberation Organization (ETLO), the World Uyghur Congress, and the East Turkistan Information Center. The Ministry further named eleven individuals as terrorists.

The Eastern Turkistan Islamic Movement, whose aim is to the establishment of a fundamentalist Muslim state to be called "East Turkistan" and the conversion of all Chinese people to Islam, operates throughout Central Asia and claimed responsibility for over 200 acts of terrorism from 1990 to 2001, resulting in at least 162 deaths and 440 injuries. Chinese authorities allege the group has a close relationship with al-Qaeda, and that it receives funding and training in Afghanistan. Rémi Castets has said that while "it is possible that these movements, and particularly the ETIM, might have had contacts with the bin Laden network and more probably with the Islamic Movement of Uzbekistan," direct ties are likely minimal because of "bin Laden's silence on East Turkistan." The group was considerable weakened following the American-led invasion of Afghanistan which saw the death of its leader Hasan Mahsum, as well as Emir Abu Mohammed, who was killed in October 2003 in raid on an al-Qaeda training camp in Waziristan by Pakistani forces. 
 According to Stratfor, following the death of Mahsum, the group fractured and a successor movement with ties to Central Asian militants was formed in Afghanistan, under the leadership of Abdul Haq. The reformed ETIM issuing several videos including threats to attack the 2008 Summer Olympics in Beijing, although no such large-scale attacks took place. Haq was allegedly killed by a US drone strike in Afghanistan in March 2010.

ETIM's capabilities and existence as depicted by the Chinese government has raised doubt amongst Uyghur dissident groups; according to Uyghur expert Dru Gladney, the majority of information on ETIM derive from Chinese government sources and lack independent verification, while other analysts noted that the ETIM was "obscure but not unknown" before the 9/11 attacks, having been documented for over 20 years by both Chinese and non-Chinese scholars. Furthermore, Uyghur dissident groups criticized the inclusion of the World Uyghur Congress and East Turkistan Information Center, claiming that both groups are NGOs based in Germany which mainly serve to report information. Chinese state-media published a statement from terrorism scholar Rohan Gunaratna, who claimed that the ETIM had "many sympathizers and supporters" within the WUC.

Out of these groups, the ETIM and ETLO were also designated to be terrorist groups by Kazakhstan, Kyrgyzstan, and the United Nations. The United States refused China's request to designate the ETLO as such in 2003, although US State Department says the ETLO has engaged "small motivated bombings and armed attacks".

Chronology of major events
Following is a partial list of events that have been described as terror attacks or attempted terrorist attacks by non-state actors in the People's Republic of China. Due to variations in the definitions and applications of the term, the characterization of some events as terrorist attacks may be disputed. Many of the incidents which are listed occurred in Xinjiang or Tibet—areas where foreign journalists have extremely limited access, and if and when they do gain permission to report in those regions, they are closely monitored. As such, many reports of violence or terrorist attacks cannot be independently confirmed, and foreign reporting frequently relies on information released by the government of China or in the state-run press. In several instances, conflicting narratives of these have emerged from witnesses or from diaspora groups.

Terrorist incidents by year

Counter-terrorism

Domestic counter-terrorism

According to political scientist Chung Chien-peng, following a spate of unrest and violence in Xinjiang and Tibet in the late 1980s and early 1990s, Chinese authorities adopted a variety of approach to suppress what it considers the "three evils": terrorism, separatism, and religious fundamentalism, which the government considers to be interconnected threats to its authorities. To combat these, the government promoted economic development through investments in infrastructure, tourism, and capital investment to spur growth, and encouraged ethnic Han migration into the western regions. In addition, authorities launched "strike hard" campaigns against crime, which also had the effect of targeting expressions of separatism and unauthorized religious practice.

Chung noted that in recent years, Chinese authorities have allowed for a gradual expansion of individual freedoms in many spheres, all the while maintaining strict control over religious, cultural, and literary associations of ethnic minorities in Xinjiang and Tibet.
In 1997, a "strike hard" campaign began in Tibet and Xinjiang involving in tightly controlling religious activities and festivals. In Tibet, authorities sought to curtail the influence of the Dalai Lama by banning all displays of his image, and in 1995, authorities replaced his choice of the number two Panchen Lama with a Beijing-approved candidate. In Xinjiang, authorities placed restrictions on unofficial religious practices, and closely monitored Muslims returning from madrasah schools overseas.

Chung also noted that corresponding to the launch of strike-hard campaigns and economic stimulus efforts, there was an apparent decrease in the level of organized violent protest or bombings in the Western autonomous regions. Whereas levels of anti-government violence were high from 1987 to 1997, reported instances were virtually non-existent in the several years that followed. In the aftermath of the strike-hard campaigns, Tibetan and Uyghur dissident groups overseas have adjusted their strategies in promoting their causes: as of 1998 the Dalai Lama has no longer called for outright Tibetan independence, and Uyghur groups have become more adept in framing their cause as one of human rights and free elections. Chung noted that while instances of violent organized protest and bombings have decreased, heightened tensions between local ethnic groups and the Han Chinese who have migrated into Xinjiang and Tibet en masse since the 1990s. According to Chung, in terms of public relations and reporting incidences of violence, local authorities are encouraged to take accounts of foreign investments so that they would not be discouraged by violence, but at the same time, authorities needed justifications to initiate actions against separatist groups.

International cooperation
The government of the People's Republic of China has engaged in cooperation at the bilateral and multilateral level to gain support for its efforts to combat terrorism and ethnic separatism. This has increased following the September 11 attacks in the United States, which led to the global War on Terror.

Much of this cooperation involves the Shanghai Cooperation Organisation, which includes several Central Asian states home to large ethnic Uyghur populations. The Chinese government has periodically requested that authorities in Kyrgyzstan and Kazakhstan crack down on Uyghur secessionists, and that they extradite suspected terrorists and separatists to China. The Government of Kazakhstan has consistently extradited Uyghur terrorist suspects to China and in 2006 participated in a large-scale, joint counter-terrorism drill.

The Chinese and Kyrgyz governments increased security along their borders with each other and Tajikistan in January 2007 after Chinese government officials expressed concern that possible terrorists were traveling through Xinjiang and Central Asia to carry out attacks. The warning followed a high-profile raid on a training camp in Akto County, Xinjiang run by suspected East Turkestan Islamic Movement members.

In 2006, American forces captured 22 Uyghur militants from combat zones in Afghanistan and Pakistan on information that they were linked to Al-Qaeda. They were imprisoned for five to seven years in Guantanamo Bay, where they testified that they were trained by ETIM leader Abdul Haq, at an ETIM training camp. After being reclassified as No Longer Enemy Combatant, a panel of judges ordered them released into the United States, as they could not be released back to China because of human rights concerns. A Chinese government spokesman denounced the move as a violation of international law and demanded the return of the men to China.

See also
 Terrorism in Central Asia
 Terrorism in Russia
 Crime in the People's Republic of China
 East Turkestan Islamic Movement

References

External links

 Senior Chinese official issues Bush rebuke
 Explosions in Xinjiang
 Pakistan hands over Muslim separatist leader-China
 Al-Qaeda's China problem
 Five Lessons from China's War on Terror
 Violent Separatism in Xinjiang
 Uyghur Muslim Ethnic Separatism in Xinjiang, China

 
China
Human rights abuses in China